Loops and Reels is the 12th studio album by Peter Hammill, originally released on cassette on the Sofa Sound label (catalog number SS4) in June 1983. On the back cover it says: "Two songs, two dance pieces, four near instrumentals". It was re-released on CD in 1993 (with added subtitle "Analogue Experiments 1980-1983") on Hammill's own Fie! label, with remastering done by Hammill. Both cassette and CD versions were produced and engineered by Peter Hammill, except for "A Ritual Mask", which was engineered by David Lord. "A Ritual Mask" first appeared on Music and Rhythm, an album released in 1982 consisting of songs by various artists in support of Peter Gabriel's fledgling WOMAD festival. A different version of "In Slow Time" first appeared on Hammill's 1980 album A Black Box. In 2010 Loops and Reels was released digitally in FLAC format by the distributor Burning Shed.

Track listing
All songs written by Peter Hammill, except "In Slow Time", written by Hammill and David Ferguson.

"A Ritual Mask" - 5:51
"Critical Mass" - 8:13
"The Moebius Loop" - 2:56
"An Endless Breath" - 5:28
"In Slow Time" - 3:21
"My Pulse" - 15:38
"The Bells! The Bells!" - 4:09

Personnel 
Peter Hammill – vocals, guitar, keyboards

Technical
Peter Hammill - recording engineer, mixing (Sofa Sound, Wiltshire)

References

External links

Peter Hammill albums
1983 albums